Axel (also Aksel) is a Scandinavian, German, French, and Dutch masculine given name. In Estonia, Denmark, and Norway the spelling Aksel is more common. The Finnish form of the name is Akseli. A French feminine form is Axelle.

Because the Danish archbishop Absalon (1128–1201) was also known as "Axel of Lund", the name has been interpreted as a corruption of the Hebrew name Absalom. Axel arose via Axelen from Absalon, possibly by conflation with the existing name Askel, Askil, medieval forms of the Old Norse name Ásketill, from ans "god" and ketill "cauldron/helmet".

As a given name
 Axel (born 1977), Argentine singer-songwriter
 Absalon (1128–1201), Danish archbishop also known as Axel of Lund
 Prince Axel of Denmark (1888–1964)
 Axel Aabrink (1887–1965), Danish painter
 Axel Gustav Adlercreutz (1821–1880), Swedish politician and civil servant
 Axel Alfredsson (1902–1966), Swedish footballer
 Axel Algmark (born 1990), Swedish pop singer
 Axel von Ambesser (1910–1988), German actor and film director
 Axel Anderberg (1860–1937), Swedish architect
 Axel Andersen (1891–1931), Danish gymnast 
 Axel Andersen Byrval (1875–1957), Danish football player and manager
 Axel Anderson (1929–2012), German-born Puerto Rican actor, television producer and television host
 Axel Andersson (1887–1951), Swedish track and field athlete
 Axel Andrésson (1895–1961), Icelandic footballer and football club founder
 Axel Óskar Andrésson (born 1998), Icelandic footballer
 Axel Aubert (1873–1943), Norwegian chemical engineer 
 Axel Augis (born 1990), French gymnast 
 Axel Axelsson (born 1942), Icelandic footballer
 Axel Axelsson (born 1951), Icelandic handball player
 Axel Axgil (1915–2011), Danish gay rights activist, first man to enter into a same-sex registered partnership
 Axel Bäck (born 1987), Swedish alpine skier 
 Axel Bachmann (born 1989), Paraguayan chess player 
 Axel Bakayoko (born 1998), French footballer
 Axel Bakunts (1899–1937), Armenian prose writer, film-writer, translator and activist
 Axel Bassani (born 1999), Italian motorcycle racer
 Axel Bauer (born 1961), French singer
 Axel J. Beck (1894-1981), American federal judge
 Axel D. Becke (born 1953), Canadian physical chemist, professor and researcher 
 Axel Bellinghausen (born 1983), German footballer 
 Axel Berg  (1856-1929), Danish architect
 Axel Berg (born 1959), German politician
 Axel Berndt (born 19??), German sprint canoer 
 Axel Birnbaum (born 1966), Austrian fencer
 Axel Bloch (1911–1998), Danish fencer
 Jan Axel Blomberg (born 1969), Norwegian heavy metal drummer (Mayhem, Arcturus)
 Axel von Blomberg (1908–1941), German Air Force officer
 Axel Blomqvist (1894–1965), Swedish speed skater
 Axel Blumberg (1981-2004), Argentine kidnap and murder victim
 Axel Gudbrand Blytt (1843–1898), Norwegian botanist and geologist
 Jonas Axel Boeck (1833–1873), Norwegian marine biologist
 Axel Boëthius (1889– 1969), Swedish scholar and archaeologist of Etruscan culture
 Axel Boman (born 19??), Swedish house music DJ and producer
 Axel Borgmann (born 1994), German footballer 
 Axel Borup-Jørgensen (1924–2012), Danish composer 
 Axel Börsch-Supan (born 1954), German economist and researcher
 Axel Brage (born 1989), Swedish ice hockey player
 Axel Braun (born 19??), Italian adult film producer and director 
 Axel Brauns (born 1963), German writer and filmmaker
 Axel Ludvig Broström (1838–1905), Swedish shipping magnate
 Axel Brown (born 1992), Trinidadian - British bobsledder
 Axel T. Brunger (born 1956), German-born American biophysicist
 Axel Bruns (born 19??), German-born Australian scholar
 Axel Brusewitz (1881–1950), Swedish political scientist and professor
 Axel Buch (1930–1998), Norwegian politician 
 Axel Bulthaupt (born 1966), German journalist, entertainer and television presenter
 Axel von dem Bussche (1919–1993), German WWII military officer, attempted to assassinate Adolf Hitler 
 Axel Cadier (1906–1974), Swedish wrestler
 Axel Chapelle (born 1995), French pole vaulter
 Axel Cleeremans (born 1962), Belgian cognitive scientist and professor
 Axel Clerget (born 1987), French judoka
 Axel Coldevin (1900–1992), Norwegian historian
 Axel Collett (1880–1968), Norwegian landowner, timber merchant and sawmill owner
 Axel Coon (born 1975), German musician
 Axel Corti (1933—1993), Austrian screenwriter, film director and radio host
 Axel Daeseleire (born 1968), Belgian actor
 Axel Danielson (1867–1949), Swedish journalist and Swedish editor
 Axel Danielsson (1863–1899), Swedish socialist agitator, journalist and writer
 Axel Didriksson (born 19??), Mexican writer, academic and professor 
 Axel Dieter Jr. (born 1990), German professional wrestler 
 Axel Disasi (born 1998), French footballer
 Axel Domont (born 1990), French racing cyclist
 Axel Doruelo (born 1982), Filipino basketball player
 Axel Dreher (born 1972), German economist
 Axel Drolsum (1846–1927), Norwegian librarian
 Axel Düberg (1927–2001), Swedish film actor
 Axel Dünnwald-Metzler (1939–2004), German footballer
 Axel Edelstam (1924–2012), Swedish diplomat
 Axel Bjorn Edwards (2022-), British Baby
 Axel Eggebrecht (1899–1991), German journalist and writer
 Axel Ehnström (born 1990), Finnish singer-songwriter 
 Axel Eidstedt (born 1995), Swedish ice hockey player
 Axel Ekblom (1893–1957), Swedish sport shooter
 Axel Elmlund (1838–1901), ballet dancer and stage actor 
 Axel Elofs (1903–1983), Swedish long-distance runner
 Axel Ender (1853-1920), Norwegian painter and sculptor
 Axel Enström (1893–1977), Swedish industrialist
 Axel Fredrik Enström (1875–1948), Swedish electrical engineer
 Axel Eriksson (1884–1975), Swedish rower
 Axel Wilhelm Eriksson (1846–1901) Swedish ornithologist, settler, explorer and trader 
 Axel Erlandson (1884–1964), Swedish-born American farmer and horticulturalist 
 Axel von Fersen the Elder (1719–1794), Swedish statesman and soldier
 Axel von Fersen the Younger (1755–1810), Swedish count, diplomat, military general and statesman
 Axel Firsoff (1912–1981), Swedish-British amateur astronomer and author 
 Axel Fischer (born 1966), German politician
 Axel Foley (born 19??), American hip hop musician 
 Axel Olof Freudenthal (1836–1911), Finnish philologist and politician
 Axel Gabrielsson (1886–1975), Swedish rower 
 Axel Gade (1860–1921), Danish violinist, composer and conductor
 Axel Gedaschko (born 1959), German politician
 Axel Geller (born 1999), Argentine tennis player
 Axel Gjöres (1889–1979), Swedish politician
 Axel Gotthard (born 1959), German historian and professor
 Axel Graatkjær (1885–1969), Danish cinematographer 
 Axel Grandjean (1847-1932), Danish composer and conductor
 Axel Gresvig (born 1941), Norwegian competitive sailor
 Axel Grönberg (1918–1988), Swedish wrestler
 Axel Gyldenstierne (–1603) Danish-Norwegian official and Governor-general of Norway 
 Axel Gyllenkrok (1665–1730), Swedish baron, military general and governor of Gothenburg
 Axel Gyllenkrok (1888-1946), Norwegian sport shooter
 Axel Gyntersberg (–1588), Norwegian nobleman and feudal overlord
 Axel Otto Hagemann (1856–1907), Norwegian politician 
 Axel Hager (born 1969), German beach volleyball player 
 Axel Haig (1835–1921), Swedish-born British artist, architect and illustrator
 Axel Hallberg (born 1999), Swedish politician
 Axel Hamberg (1863–1933), Swedish mineralogist, geographer, explorer, photographer and professor of geography 
 Axel Hampus Dalström (1829–1882), Finnish architect
 Axel Hansen (1899–1933), Danish cyclist
 Axel Henry Hansen (1887–1980), Norwegian gymnast
 Axel von Harnack (1895–1974), German librarian, historian and philologist
 Axel Härstedt (born 1987), Swedish discus thrower
 Axel Haverich (born 1953), German cardiac surgeon
 Axel Hedfors (aka Axwell, born 1977), Swedish DJ and musician 
 Axel Hedenlund (1888–1919), Swedish track and field athlete
 Axel Heiberg (1848–1932), Norwegian diplomat and financier 
 Axel Heiberg (1908–1988), Norwegian judge
 Axel Heiberg Stang (1904–1974), Norwegian politician, landowner and forester
 Axel C. Heitmann (born 1959), German business executive 
 Axel Hellstrom (1893–1933), German muscle reader, mentalist and stage magician
 Axel Helsted (1847-1907), Danish painter
 Axel Nicolai Herlofson (1845–1910), Norwegian fraudster and criminal
 Axel Hervelle (born 1983), Belgian basketball player 
 Axel Hilgenstöhler (born 1975), German record producer, mixing engineer and guitarist
 Axel Hirsoux (born 1982), Belgian singer
 Axel Høeg-Hansen (1877-1947), Danish architect
 Axel Högel (1884–1970), Swedish actor
 Axel Höjer (1890-1974), Swedish physician  
 Axel Holmström (1881–1947), Swedish anarchist
 Axel Holmström (born 1996), Swedish ice hockey player
 Axel Holst (1860–1931), Norwegian physician and professor of hygiene and bacteriology 
 Axel Honneth (born 1949), German philosopher, theorist and professor
 Axel Horn (1913–2001), American artist
 Axel Hultgren (1886–1974), Swedish metallurgist
 Axel Hütte (born 1951), German photographer
 Axel Ingwersen (18??–19??), Danish sailor
 Axel Jang (born 1968), German bobsledder
 Axel Janse (1888–1973), Swedish gymnast
 Axel Jansson (1882–1909), Swedish sport shooter
 Axel Jansson (1916–1968), Swedish politician
 Axel Jensen (1899–1968), Danish long-distance runner
 Axel Jensen (1932–2003), Norwegian author
 Axel P. Jensen (1885–1972), Danish landscape painter 
 Axel Kacou (born 1995), Ivorian-French footballer 
 Axel Kahn (1944–2021), French scientist and geneticist
 Axel Kassegger (born 1966), Austrian politician 
 Axel Keller (born 1977), German footballer
 Axel Kicillof (born 1971), Argentine economist and politician
 Axel Kielland (1907–1963), journalist and playwright
 Axel Klinckowström (1867–1936), Swedish baron, zoologist, explorer, fiction writer and memoirist
 Axel Kober (born 1970), German conductor
 Axel Kock (1851–1935), Swedish philologist and professor of Scandinavian languages 
 Axel Koenders (born 1959), Dutch triathlete
 Axel Köhler (born 1959), German countertenor and opera director 
 Axel Kolle (born 1973), Norwegian footballer
 Axel Cédric Konan (born 1983), Ivorian footballer
 Axel van der Kraan (born 1949), Dutch sculptor
 Axel Krause (born 1958), German painter and graphic artist
 Axel Kristiansson (1914–1999), Swedish politician
 Axel Kruse (born  1967), German footballer
 Axel Kühn (born 1967), German bobsledder
 Axel Kurck (1555-1630), Finnish warlord
 Axel van Lamsweerde (born 1947), Belgian computer scientist and professor
 Axel Lapp (born 1966), German curator, art historian and publisher
 Axel Larsson (1901–1984), Swedish wrestler
 Axel Lawarée (born 1973), Belgian footballer
 Axel Leijonhufvud (born 1933), Swedish economist and professor 
 Axel Lerche (1903–1949), Danish sports shooter
 Axel Lesser (born 1946), German cross country skier
 Axel Lewenhaupt (born 1917), Swedish diplomat 
 Axel Liebmann (1849–1876), Danish composer
 Axel Lille (1848–1921), Finnish journalist and politician 
 Axel Lillie (1603–1662), Swedish soldier and politician
 Axel Lindahl (1841–1906), Swedish photographer
 Axel Lindstrom (1895-1940), Swedish baseball player 
 Axel Ljung (1884–1938), Swedish gymnast and track and field athlete 
 Axel Ljungdahl (1897–1995), Swedish Air Force general
 Aksel Lund Svindal, Norwegian alpine ski racer
 Axel Fredrik Londen (1859–1928), Finnish sports shooter
 Axel Louissaint (born 1996), Swiss basketball player
 Axel Løvenskiold (1912–1980), Norwegian landowner and painter
 Axel Löwen (1686–1773), Swedish nobleman and military officer 
 Axel Mackenrott (born 1969), German heavy metal keyboardist (Masterplam)
 Axel Madsen (1930–2007), Danish-born American biographer and journalist
 Axel Malmgren (1857-1901), Swedish artist
 Axel Maraval (born 1993), French footballer
 Axel Matus (born 1998), Mexican racing driver 
 Axel Maurer (1866–1925),Norwegian stagewriter, editor and theatre director
 Axel Maußen (born 1968), German Roman Catholic priest
 Axel Médéric (born 1970), French figure skater
 Axel Merckx (born 1972), Belgian cyclist
 Axel Méyé (born 1995), Gabonese footballer
 Axel Meyer (born 1960), German evolutionary biologist and professor of zoology 
 Axel Michon (born 1990), French tennis player
 Axel Michaels (born 1949), German professor of classical Indology and religious studies
 Axel Milberg (born 1956), German actor
 Axel Miller (born 1965), Belgian businessman
 Axel Möller (1830–1896), Swedish astronomer
 Axel Otto Mörner (1774–1852), Swedish artist and military general
 Axel Mowat (1592–1661), Norwegian naval officer and land owner
 Axel Müller (disambiguation), several people
 Axel Munthe (1857–1949), Swedish physician and psychiatrist
 Axel Murswieck (born 19??), German political scientist, commentator and professor
 Axel Neff (born 1984), American businessman
 Axel Nepraunik (born 1945), Austrian sprinter
 Axel Neumann (born 1952), German footballer 
 Axel Ngando (born 1993), French footballer
 Axel Nielsen (1902–1970), Danish astronomer
 Axel Noack (born 1961), German race walker
 Axel Nordgren (1828-1888), Swedish painter
 Axel Nordlander (1879–1962), Swedish military officer and equestrian
 Axel Norling (1884–1964), Swedish gymnast, diver, and tug of war competitor 
 Axel Otto Normann (1884–1962), Norwegian journalist, newspaper editor, theatre critic and theatre director
 Axel Oberwelland (born 1966), German businessman
 Axel Ockenfels (born 1969), German economist and professor 
 Axel Odelberg (1873-1950), Swedish chemical engineer
 Axel Ohlin (1867–1903), Swedish zoologist and Arctic and Antarctic explorer
 Axel Olrik (1864–1917), Danish folklorist and scholar of medieval historiography
 Axel Orrström (born 1986), Finnish footballer
 Axel Ottosson (born 1996), Swedish ice hockey player
 Axel Oxenstierna (1583–1654) Swedish statesman
 Axel Palmgren (1867-1939), Finnish lawyer, civil servant, business executive and politician
 Axel Paulsen (1855–1938), Norwegian figure skater and speed skater
 Axel Pehrsson-Bramstorp (1883–1954), Swedish politician and former Prime Minister of Sweden
 Axel Rudi Pell (born 1960), German heavy metal guitarist 
 Axel Perneczky (1945–2009), Hungarian neurosurgeon
 Axel Persson (1888–1955), Swedish cyclist
 Axel W. Persson (1888–1951), Swedish archaeologist
 Axel Peschel (born 1942), German cyclist
 Axel Petersen  (1880–1962) Danish track and field athlete
 Axel Petersen (1887–1968), Danish footballer  
 Axel Jacob Petersson (1834–1884), Swedish-Norwegian structural engineer and inventor
 Axel Petersson Döderhultarn (1868–1925), Swedish wood carver
 Axel Pilmark (1925–2009), Danish footballer
 Axel Poignant (1906–1986), Australian photographer
 Axel Poniatowski (born 1951), French politician 
 Axel Pons (born 1991), Spanish Grand Prix motorcycle racer and model
 Axel Poulsen (1887–1972), Danish sculptor 
 Axel Prahl (born 1960), German actor
 Axel Preisler (1871–1930), Danish architect
 Axel Pretzsch (born 1976), German tennis player 
 Axel Proet Høst (1907–1985), Norwegian sports official
 Axel Rappe (1838–1918), Swedish Army general
 Axel Rappe (1884–1945), Swedish Army major general
 Axel Rauschenbach (born 1967), German pair skater
 Axel de Reuterskiöld (1860–1937), Swedish Baron and philatelist
 Axel Revold (1887–1962), Norwegian painter, illustrator and art professor 
 Axel Reymond (born 1994), French marathon swimmer
 Axel Ripke (1880–1937), German journalist and politician 
 Axel Rodrigues de Arruda (born 1970), Brazilian footballer
 Axel Romdahl (18801951), Swedish art historian and museum curator
 Axel Roos (born 1964), German footballer and coach 
 Axl Rose (born 1962), Lead vocalist of the American hard rock band Guns N' Roses
 Axel Rosenkrantz (1670–1723), Norwegian landowner and baron
 Axel Roth (born 1936), German-born American NASA engineer 
 Axel Rubbestad (1888-1961), Swedish politician
 Axel Runström (1883–1943), Swedish water polo player and diver
 Axel Ryding (1831–1897), Swedish Army lieutenant general
 Axel Salzmann (born 1950), German pair skater
 Axel Seeberg (1931–2011), Norwegian archaeologist
 Axel Siefer (born 1950), German actor
 Axel Simonsen (1887–1938), Norwegian long-distance runner
 Axel Sjöberg (born 1991), Swedish footballer 
 Axel Sjöblad (born 1967), Swedish handball player 
 Axel Sjöblom (1882–1951), Swedish gymnast
 Axel Skovgaard (1875–19??), Danish-born American violinist
 Axel Smeets (born 1974), Belgian footballer and manager
 Axel Smith (1744–1823), Norwegian priest and topographer
 Axel Smith (chess player) (born 1986), Swedish chess player
  (1856–1935), Norwegian parliamentary representative
 Axel Sømme (1899–1991), Norwegian geographer, political activist, magazine and newspaper editor
 Axel Springer (1912–1985), German publisher
 Axel Ståhle (1891–1987), Swedish Army officer and equestrian
 Axel Stawski (born 1950), American real estate developer and investor
 Axel Stein (born 1982), German actor
 Axel Stoll (1948–2014), German geophysicist and conspiracy theorist
 Axel Stordahl (1913–1963), American composer and arranger
 Axel Strand (1893–1983), Swedish trade union organizer
 Axel Strauss (born 19??), German violinist music professor 
 Axel Strøbye (1928–2005), Danish actor
 Axel Strøm (1901–1985), Norwegian physician
 Axel Sundermann (born 1968), German former footballer
 Axel Sundquist (1867–1910), American sailor
 Axel Svendsen (1912–1995), Danish canoeist
 Axel Sveinsson (1896-1957), Icelandic civil engineer
 Axel Tallberg (1860–1928), Swedish visual artist and engraver
 Axel Teichmann (born 1979), German cross-country skier
 Axel Tetens (1892–1961), Danish wrestler
 Axel Thallaug (1866–1938), Norwegian lawyer and politician
 Axel Thayssen (1885–1952), Danish tennis player
 Axel Tony (born 1984), French singer 
 Axel Törneman (1880–1925), Swedish painter
 Axel Toupane (born 1992), French basketball player 
 Axel Troost (born 1954), German economist and politician
 Axel Tuanzebe (born 1997), Congolese-born British footballer
 Axel Ullrich (born 1943), German biologist, oncologist and cancer researcher 
 Axel Urup (1601–1671), Danish military engineer and commander and judge
 Axel Vennersten (1863–1948), Swedish politician
 Axel Villanueva (born 1989), Nicaraguan footballer
 Axel Vogt (1849–1921), American railroad mechanical engineer
 Axel Voss (born 1963), German politician
 Axel Wachtmeister, Count of Mälsåker (1643–1699), Swedish count and field marshal
 Axel Wahlstedt (1867–1943), Swedish sports shooter
 Axel Wallengren (1865–1896), Swedish author, poet, and journalist
 Axel A. Weber (born 1957), German economist, professor and banker
 Axel Weber (1954–2001), German pole vaulter
 Axel Wegner (born 1963), German sports shooter
 Axel Welin (1862–1951), Swedish inventor and industrialist
 Axel Wenner-Gren (1881–1961), Swedish entrepreneur
 Axel Fahel (1993), Brazil, Programmer and IT Specialist
 Axel Werner (born 1996), Argentine footballer
 Axel Westermark (1875–1911), American sailor
 Axel Wibrån (born 1985), Swedish footballer
 Axel Wieandt (born 1966), German businessman
 Axel Wikström (1907–1976), Swedish cross-country skier
 Axel Williams (born 1983), Tahitian footballer 
 Axel Willner (aka The Field, born 19??), Swedish electronic music
 Axel Witsel (born 1989), Belgian footballer
 Axel Wittke (born 1960), German footballer
 Axel Zeebroek (born 1978), Belgian triathlete
 Axel Zitzmann (born 1959), German ski jumper
 Axel Zwingenberger (born 1955), German blues and boogie-woogie pianist

Fictional characters
Akseli Koskela, in the Finnish novel Täällä Pohjantähden alla by Väinö Linna
Axel, a Belgian steam locomotive in the Thomas & Friends film The Great Race
Axel, a grasshopper in the 1998 animated film A Bug's Life
Axel, a character from the Kingdom Hearts video game series
Axel, a character from the Crazy Taxi video game series
Axel, a protagonist in Jules Verne's A Journey to the Center of the Earth
Axel, from the book The Bane Chronicles by Cassandra Clare
Axel, in the film My Bloody Valentine
Axel (The Walking Dead), a former prisoner and member of the group of survivors on the TV series The Walking Dead
Axel Blaze, the English name for Gouenji Shuuya, a main character in the manga and anime Inazuma Eleven by Tenya Yabuno
Axel the Dark Hero, from the Disgaea video game series
Axel Foley, a leading character in the Beverly Hills Cop movies
Axel Freed, the main character in the movie The Gambler (1974 film)
Axel Hawk, from the video game series Fatal Fury
Axel Jordache, in Irwin Shaw's novel Rich Man, Poor Man: the father of the novel's three central characters
Axel Miller, in the American-Canadian TV series Van Helsing
Axel Rex, in Vladimir Nabokov's novel Laughter in the Dark
Axel Steel, in the Guitar Hero video game series
Axel Stone, from the Streets of Rage video game series
Axel Thurston, in the anime series Eureka Seven
Axel the Water Buffalo, a villain from the Sonic the Hedgehog comic from Archie Comics
Axl, a protagonist in Kazuo Ishiguro's The Buried Giant
Axl, from the Mega Man X series
Axl, from the series Nexo Knights
Axl Heck, in the TV series The Middle
Axl Low, from the Guilty Gear series of fighting games

As a surname
Curtis Axel (born 1979), ring name of American professional wrestler Joseph Curtis Hennig
Gabriel Axel (1918–2014), Danish filmmaker
Richard Axel (born 1946), American scientist

See also
Axelrod

References

Scandinavian masculine given names
Danish masculine given names
Swedish masculine given names
Norwegian masculine given names
Icelandic masculine given names
Faroese masculine given names
German masculine given names
Dutch masculine given names
Jewish given names